Glenn Clarence Cunningham (September 10, 1912 – December 18, 2003) was an American Republican politician.

He was born in Omaha, Nebraska on September 10, 1912 and graduated from the University of Nebraska at Omaha in 1935.  He sold insurance for a while.  From 1946 to 1948 he was a member of the Omaha board of education and a member of Omaha city council from 1947 to 1948.  He was elected  Mayor of Omaha from 1949 to 1954.

He was a delegate to the 1948 Republican National Convention and to the 1952 Republican National Convention.  He was elected as a Republican to the Eighty-fifth United States Congress and to the six succeeding Congresses  serving from January 3, 1957 to January 3, 1971. Cunningham voted in favor of the Civil Rights Acts of 1957, 1960, 1964, and 1968, and the Voting Rights Act of 1965, but did not vote on the 24th Amendment to the U.S. Constitution. He lost his bid for renomination to the Ninety-second United States Congress in 1970 to then Douglas County Commissioner John Y. McCollister.  He died on December 18, 2003, in Omaha.  He was a member of the Episcopalian church and of Pi Kappa Alpha.

Glenn Cunningham Lake was named for Cunningham.

References 

 
 
 
 

1912 births
2003 deaths
Omaha City Council members
Mayors of Omaha, Nebraska
Republican Party members of the United States House of Representatives from Nebraska
School board members in Nebraska
20th-century American politicians